The War Between the States Museum, in Florence, South Carolina, United States was founded in 1988 by members of the Sons of Confederate Veterans. The house that the museum is in was the home of R. Frank McKain. Many of the artifacts that were donated to the museum were artifacts from members of the Sons of the Confederate Veterans.

The term "War Between the States" is a Southern name for the American Civil War, a term some Southerners reject. It is associated with the Lost Cause of the Confederacy; see Names of the American Civil War.

The collection consists of guns, uniforms, swords, armor, and some personal items. Rare books and documents are also a part of the collection. Lining the walls throughout the museum are pictures of veterans of the war. The photos include pictures of soldiers, government officials, civilians, and sailors. Included in the collection are many items from the Florence Stockade (prison camp for Union soldiers).

References

External links
War Between the States Museum web page

Museums established in 1988
Buildings and structures in Florence, South Carolina
Museums in Florence County, South Carolina
Sons of Confederate Veterans
American Civil War museums in South Carolina
1988 establishments in South Carolina
Lost Cause of the Confederacy